The Jaffna Kings (often abbreviated as JK) is a franchise cricket team which competes in 2021 Lanka Premier League (LPL). The team is based in Jaffna, Northern Province, Sri Lanka. In September 2021, Jaffna Stallions changed their name to Jaffna Kings having new owners (Lyca Group). The team was captained by Thisara Perera and coached by Thilina Kandamby. They were defending champions having won LPL 2020. In the final, they beat Galle Gladiators by 23 runs to win their second successive LPL title.

Current squad
 Players with international caps are listed in bold.
  denotes a player who is currently unavailable for selection.
  denotes a player who is unavailable for rest of the season.

Administration and support staff

Season standings

Points table

League stage

Playoffs

Qualifier 1

Qualifier 2

Final

Statistics

Most runs

Most wickets

References 

2021 Lanka Premier League